Asterios Giakoumis (born 3 May 1988) is a Greek professional footballer who plays as a goalkeeper.

Career
Born in Kymina, Thessaloniki, Giakoumis plays for PAOK. He moved from Agrotikos Asteras in August 2010. He was voted best goalkeeper of the Football League for the season 2009/2010. He was also member of the 
Greek U21 Football Team Greek U21 Football Team. On 31 August 2012, Giakoumis was loaned back to Agrotikos Asteras for the rest of the season.

External links
Profile at Onsports.gr

1988 births
Living people
PAOK FC players
Greek footballers
Association football goalkeepers
Footballers from Thessaloniki